Frederick Holman Miller (June 28, 1886 in Fairfield, Indiana – May 2, 1953 in Brookville, Indiana), nicknamed "Speedy", he was a pitcher in Major League Baseball. He pitched in six games for the 1910 Brooklyn Superbas.

External links

Major League Baseball pitchers
Brooklyn Superbas players
Baseball players from Indiana
1886 births
1953 deaths
Minor league baseball managers
Paducah Indians players
Jackson Senators players
Columbia Gamecocks players
Charlotte Hornets (baseball) players
Montgomery Rebels players
People from Howard County, Indiana
People from Brookville, Indiana